Zalman Friedmann (1912 – 6 May 1987), also nicknamed Dzampa, was an Israeli footballer who played as a midfielder for Beitar Tel Aviv and the Mandatory Palestine national team.

Friedmann represented Mandatory Palestine in both their first and last international match, respectively against Egypt in 1934 and Lebanon in 1940; he made three official international caps.

References

External links
 

1912 births
1987 deaths
Jewish Israeli sportspeople
Association football midfielders
Mandatory Palestine footballers
Israeli footballers
Mandatory Palestine international footballers
Hapoel Tel Aviv F.C. players